Maxime Pianfetti (born 15 March 1999) is a French fencer. He won the silver medal in the men's sabre event at the 2022 World Fencing Championships. He is also U23 European champion in 2022.

References

External links 

1999 births
Living people
Place of birth missing (living people)
French male fencers
French male sabre fencers
World Fencing Championships medalists
Universiade medalists in fencing
Universiade bronze medalists for France
Medalists at the 2019 Summer Universiade
20th-century French people
21st-century French people